The following is a list of airports in the San Diego Area:

International airports

United States
It is owned by the San Diego County Regional Airport Authority.

Mexico
 Tijuana International Airport  (Tijuana, Baja California, Mexico), also known as General Abelardo L. Rodríguez International Airport, is directly adjacent the USA-Mexico border.

Military Airfields
 Coast Guard Air Station San Diego (San Diego, California) - shares field with San Diego International Airport.
 Naval Outlying Landing Field Imperial Beach (Imperial Beach, California)
 Marine Corps Air Station Camp Pendleton (MCAS Camp Pendleton) - a United States Marine Corps airfield located within Marine Corps Base Camp Pendleton.
 Marine Corps Air Station Miramar (MCAS Miramar) - a United States Marine Corps airfield located within Miramar, San Diego, California, formerly known as Naval Air Station (NAS) Miramar.

Towered General Aviation airports
 Gillespie Field  is a county-owned public-use airport located 10 miles (16 km) northeast of the central business district of San Diego in El Cajon.
 McClellan-Palomar Airport  is a public airport located three miles (5 km) southeast of the central business district of Carlsbad.
 Montgomery Field  is located six miles (10 km) north of the central business district of San Diego.
 Ramona Airport  is located two miles (3 km) west of the central business district of Ramona.

Non-towered General Aviation airports
 Agua Caliente Airport  is located one mile (1.6 km) northeast of Agua Caliente Springs.
 Borrego Valley Airport  is located three nautical miles (6 km) east of the central business district of Borrego Springs.
 Fallbrook Community Airpark  is located two miles (3.2 km) south of Fallbrook.
 Jacumba Airport
 Lake Wohlford
 Oceanside Municipal Airport  is a public airport located two miles (3 km) northeast of the central business district of Oceanside.
 Ocotillo Airport
 Pauma Valley Airfield

Other notable aviation facilities
 Torrey Pines Gliderport  is a city-owned private-use glider airport located 11 nautical miles (20 km) northwest of the central business district of San Diego.

Notable closed airports
 Border Naval Outlying Landing Field South San Diego - now Border Field State Park
 Del Mar Municipal Airport
 Kearney-Mesa Airport (Kearney Mesa)
 La Pressa Airport (Spring Valley) - now Spring Valley Shopping Center
 Linda Vista Mesa Field (also known as Hourglass Field and Miramar Naval Outer Landing Field) (Mira Mesa)
 National City Airport (National City) - now part of California State Route 54, and National City Boulevard & West 35th Street in National City
 Otay-Mesa Naval Auxiliary Air Station (NAAS) (Otay Mesa)
 Red Beach Marine Corps Airfield (Oceanside)
 Sweetwater Dam Naval Outlying Landing Field (also known as Sweetwater Airport) (Encanto) - now Paradise Hills housing development
North Coyote Wells Naval Outlying Landing Field
South Coyote Wells Naval Outlying Landing Field
Rosedale Naval Outlying Landing Field

See also
 Air Route Traffic Control Center
 Los Angeles Air Route Traffic Control Center
 San Diego Harbor Police
 Port of San Diego

References

Transportation in San Diego
San Diego
San Diego area
 
Airports